The 2020–21 Wofford Terriers men's basketball team represented Wofford College during the 2020–21 NCAA Division I men's basketball season. The team were led by second-year head coach Jay McAuley, and played their home games at Jerry Richardson Indoor Stadium in Spartanburg, South Carolina as a member of the Southern Conference.

Previous season
The Terriers finished the 2019–20 season 19–16 overall, 8–10 in SoCon play to finish in seventh place. They defeated The Citadel, Furman, and Chattanooga to advance to the championship game of the SoCon tournament where they lost to East Tennessee State. All postseason play was canceled due to the ongoing COVID-19 pandemic.

Roster

Schedule and results

|-
!colspan=12 style=|Non-conference regular season

|-
!colspan=12 style=|Southern Conference regular season

|-
!colspan=12 style=| SoCon tournament

References

Wofford Terriers men's basketball seasons
Wofford Terriers
Wofford Terriers men's basketball
Wofford Terriers men's basketball